Public Sector Undertakings (PSUs) are government owned establishments, which are established and owned by the Government of India or State governments of India. The public sector undertakings are established either by nationalisation or an executive order incase of union government and state government or act of parliament incase of  union government and  act of state legislature incase of  state government  with the purpose to earn profit for the government, control monopoly of the private sector entities, offer products & services at an affordable price to the citizens, implementation of government schemes and to deliver products & services to remote locations of the country.

PSUs are also called government-owned enterprises or government-owned corporations or statutory corporations or nationalised corporations. These establishments  are wholly or partly owned by the Government of India and/or one of the many state governments of India.   Central Public Sector Undertakings (CPSUs) are wholly or partly owned by the Government of India, while State Public Sector Undertakings (SPSUs) are wholly or partly owned by state or territorial governments.

In 1951, there were five PSUs under the ownership of government sector in India. By March 2021, the number of such government entities had increased to 365. These government entities represented a total investment of about ₹16.41 lakh crore as of 31 March 2019. Their total paid-up capital as of 31 March 2019 stood at about ₹2.76 lakh crore. CPSEs have earned a revenue of about ₹24.43 lakh crore + 1 lakh crore during the financial year 2018–19.

History

When India achieved independence in 1947, it was primarily an agrarian entity, with a weak industrial base. There were only eighteen state-owned Indian Ordnance Factories, previously established to reduce the dependency of the British Indian Army on imported arms.

The British Raj had previously elected to leave agricultural production to the Private sector, with tea processing firms, Jute mills (such as the Acland Mill), railways, electricity utilities, banks, coal mines, and steel mills being just some of the economic entities largely owned by private individuals like the industrialist Jamsetji Tata. Other entities were listed on the Bombay Stock Exchange.

Critics of private ownership of India's agricultural and industrial entities—most notably Mahatma Gandhi's independence movement—instead advocated for a self-sufficient, largely agrarian, communal village-based existence for India in the first half of the 20th century. Other contemporary criticisms of India's public sector targeted the lack of well-funded schools, public libraries, universities, hospitals and medical and engineering colleges; a lack seen as impeding an Indian replication of Britain's own industrialization in the previous century.

Post-Independence, the national consensus turned in favor of rapid industrialisation of the economy, a process seen as the key to economic development, improved living standards and economic sovereignty. Building upon the Bombay Plan, which noted the necessity of government intervention and regulation in the economy, the first Industrial Policy Resolution announced in 1948 laid down in broad strokes such a strategy of industrial development. Later, the Planning Commission was formed by a cabinet resolution in March 1950 and the Industrial (Development and Regulation) Act was enacted in 1951 with the objective of empowering the government to take necessary steps to regulate industry.

The first Prime Minister of India, Jawaharlal Nehru, promoted an economic policy based on import substitution industrialisation and advocated a mixed economy. He believed that the establishment of basic and heavy industry was fundamental to the development and modernisation of the Indian economy. India's second five year plan (1956–60) and the Industrial Policy Resolution of 1956 emphasized the development of public sector enterprises to meet Nehru's national industrialisation policy. His vision was carried forward by Dr. V. Krishnamurthy, a figure known as the "Father of Public sector undertakings in India". Indian statistician Prasanta Chandra Mahalanobis was instrumental to its formulation, which was later termed the Feldman–Mahalanobis model.

In 1969, Indira Gandhi's government nationalised fourteen of India's largest private banks, and an additional six in 1980. This government-led industrial policy, with corresponding restrictions on private enterprise, was the dominant pattern of Indian economic development until the 1991 Indian economic crisis. After the crisis, the government began divesting its ownership of several PSUs to raise capital and privatize companies facing poor financial performance and low efficiency.

Management
The public sector undertakings are headed by the head of board of directors also known as chairperson cum managing director cum chief executive officer and a vice chairperson cum deputy managing director cum co-chief executive officer along with the members of the  board of directors also known as executive director cum c-level officer who are Group 'A' gazetted officers appointed by the President of India in case of central public sector undertakings, its subsidiaries & its divisions and appointed by the Governor of States of India incase of state public sector undertakings, its subsidiaries & its divisions. The officers and employees working for public sector undertakings, subsidiaries of public sector undertakings and divisions of public sector undertakings are also classified as gazetted officers and full-fledged government employees.

All of the public sector undertakings have been awarded additional financial autonomy. Public Sector Undertakings are government establishments that have comparative advantages", giving them greater autonomy to compete in the global market so as to "support [them] in their drive to become global giants". Financial autonomy was initially awarded to nine PSUs as Navratna status in 1997. Originally, the term Navaratna meant a talisman composed of nine precious gems. Later, this term was adopted in the courts of the Gupta emperor Vikramaditya and Mughal emperor Akbar, as the collective name for nine extraordinary courtiers at their respective courts.

In 2010, the central government established the higher Maharatna category, which raises a public sector unit's investment ceiling from ₹1,000 crore to ₹5,000 crores. The Maharatna public sector units can now decide on investments of up to 15 per cent of their net worth in a project while the Navaratna companies could invest up to ₹1,000 crore without explicit government approval. Two categories of Miniratnas afford less extensive financial autonomy.

Guidelines for awarding Ratna status are as follows:

PSUs in India are also categorized based on their special non-financial objectives and are registered under Section 8 of Companies Act, 2013 (erstwhile Section 25 of Companies Act, 1956).

Top profit making Central PSUs

Top loss making Central PSUs

List of Central PSUs

Public Sector Units (PSUs) can be classified as Central Public Sector Enterprises (CPSEs), Public Sector Banks (PSBs), or State Level Public Enterprises (SLPEs). CPSEs are administered by the Ministry of Heavy Industries and Public Enterprises. The Department of Public Enterprises (DPE), Ministry of Finance is the nodal department for all the Central Public Sector Enterprises (CPSEs).

As of October 2021, there are 12 Maharatnas, 12 Navratnas and 73 Miniratnas (divided into Category 1 and Category 2).

List of Maharatna CPSUs
 Oil and Natural Gas Corporation (ONGC)
 Bharat Heavy Electricals Limited (BHEL)
 Bharat Petroleum Corporation Limited (BPCL)
 Coal India Limited (CIL)
 Gas Authority of India Limited (GAIL)
 Hindustan Petroleum Corporation Limited (HPCL)
 Indian Oil Corporation Limited (IOCL)
 National Thermal Power Corporation (NTPC)
 Power Grid Corporation of India(PGCIL)
 Steel Authority of India Limited (SAIL)
 Power Finance Corporation Limited (PFCL)
 Rural Electrification Corporation Limited (REC)

List of Navratna CPSUs
 Bharat Electronics Limited (BEL)
 Container Corporation of India (CONCOR)
 Engineers India Limited (EIL)
 Hindustan Aeronautics Limited (HAL)
 Mahanagar Telephone Nigam Limited (MTNL)
 National Aluminium Company (NALCO)
 National Buildings Construction Corporation (NBCC)
 National Mineral Development Corporation (NMDC)
 NLC India Limited (Neyveli Lignite)
 Oil India Limited (OIL)
 Rashtriya Ispat Nigam Limited (RINL)
 Shipping Corporation of India (SCI)

List of Miniratna CPSUs
Miniratna Category-I (61)

 Airports Authority of India (AAI)
 ONGC Videsh Limited
 Antrix Corporation
 Balmer Lawrie
 Braithwaite & Co.
 Bharat Coking Coal Limited (BCCL)
 Bharat Dynamics Limited (BDL)
 Bharat Earth Movers Limited (BEML)
 Bharat Sanchar Nigam Limited (BSNL)
 Bridge and Roof Company (India)
 Central Electronics Limited
 Central Warehousing Corporation
 Central Coalfields Limited
 Central Mine Planning & Design Institute Limited 
 Chennai Petroleum Corporation (CPCL)
 Cochin Shipyard (CSL)
 Cotton Corporation of India Limited (CCIL)
 EdCIL (India) Limited
 Garden Reach Shipbuilders & Engineers (GRSE)
 Goa Shipyard (GSL)
 Hindustan Copper (HCL)
 HLL Lifecare
 Hindustan Newsprint
 Hindustan Paper Corporation Limited 
 Housing and Urban Development Corporation (HUDCO)
 HSCC India Limited
 Indian Tourism Development Corporation (ITDC)
 Indian Rare Earths 
 Indian Railway Catering and Tourism Corporation (IRCTC)
 Indian Railway Finance Corporation
 Indian Renewable Energy Development Agency Limited 
 India Trade Promotion Organisation (ITPO)
 Ircon International
 Kudremukh Iron Ore Company (KIOCL)
 Mazagon Dock Limited
 Mahanadi Coalfields (MCL)
 MOIL Limited
 Mangalore Refinery and Petrochemicals Limited (MRPL)
 Mineral Exploration Corporation Limited 
 Mishra Dhatu Nigam
 MMTC Ltd.
 MSTC Limited
 National Fertilizers (NFL)
 National Projects Construction Corporation 
 National Small Industries Corporation
 National Seed Corporation (NSC)
 NHPC Limited
 Northern Coalfields (NCL)
 North Eastern Electric Power Corporation Limited (NEEPCL)
 Numaligarh Refinery
 Pawan Hans Helicopters Limited
 Projects and Development India Limited (PDIL)
 RailTel Corporation of India
 Rail Vikas Nigam Limited (RVNL)
 Rashtriya Chemicals & Fertilizers (RCF)
 RITES
 SJVN Limited
 Security Printing and Minting Corporation of India
 Solar Energy Corporation of India
 South Eastern Coalfields (SECL)
 Telecommunications Consultants India (TCIL)
 THDC India Limited
 Western Coalfields (WCL)
 WAPCOS Limited

Miniratna Category-II (12)
 Artificial Limbs Manufacturing Corporation of India
 Bharat Pumps & Compressors
 Broadcast Engineering Consultants India Limited 
 Central Railside Warehouse Company Limited 
 Engineering Projects (India) Limited 
 FCI Aravali Gypsum and Minerals (India) Limited
 Ferro Scrap Nigam Limited
 HMT International Limited
 Indian Medicines Pharmaceutical Corporation Limited
 MECON
 National Film Development Corporation of India (NFDC)
 Rajasthan Electronics and Instruments Limited

List of other CPSEs

  Agrinnovate India Ltd.
 AFC India Limited
 Amul (Anand Milk Union Limited)
 Anushakti Vidhyut Nigam Limited
 Aravali Power Company Private Limited (APCPL)
 Bengal Chemicals and Pharmaceuticals Limited
 Bengal Immunity Limited
 Biotechnology Industry Research Assistance Council (BIRAC)
 Bird Group of Companies
 Bharat Broadband Network (BBNL)
 Bharat Gold Mines Limited
 Bharat Wagon and Engineering
 Bharat Immunologicals and Biologicals Corporation
 Brahmaputra Valley Fertilizer Corporation Ltd (BVFCL)
 Brahmaputra Cracker and Polymer Limited
 BrahMos Aerospace
 BHAVINI
 Biotech Consortium India Limited
 BHEL Electrical Machines Ltd. (EML)
 Bhor Sagar Port Limited
 BEML Midwest ltd.
 Convergence Energy Services Limited
 Cement Corporation of India
 Central Inland Water Transport Corporation Limited (CIWTC)
 Certification Engineers International Limited
 City and Industrial Development Corporation
 Chenab Valley Power Projects
 Damodar Valley Corporation (DVC)
 Dedicated Freight Corridor Corporation of India
 Delhi Metro Rail Corporation (DMRC)
 Deposit Insurance and Credit Guarantee Corporation
 Digital India Corporation
 Dredging Corporation of India
 Electronics Corporation of India Limited (ECIL)
 Employees State Insurance Corporation (ESIC)
 Energy Efficiency Services Limited (EESL)
 Export Credit Guarantee Corporation of India
 Fresh & Healthy Enterprises Limited
 Fertilizer Corporation of India
 Fertilisers and Chemicals Travancore Limited
 Food Corporation of India (FCI)
 Green Gas Limited
 Government e Marketplace
 Hemisphere Properties India Limited
 Haldia Petrochemicals Limited
 Hindustan Antibiotics Limited
 Hindustan Insecticides Limited
 Hindustan Organic Chemicals Limited (HOCL)
 Hindustan Fertilizers Corporation Limited (HFCL)
 Hindustan Prefab Limited
 Hindustan Salts Limited
 Hindustan Steelworks Construction Company Ltd.
 Hindustan Urvarak & Rasayan Limited(HURL)
 Hindustan Vegetable Oils Corporation
 Hindustan Teleprinters Limited (HTL)
 HSCC (India) Limitred
 Hotel Corporation of India Limited (HCIL)
 Jal Power Corporation Ltd.
 Karnataka Soaps and Detergents Limited
 Khadi Natural
 Khanij Bidesh India Ltd.
 Life Spring Hospitals (P) Ltd.
 Kolkata Metro Rail Corporation
 Konkan Railway Corporation
 Konkan LNG
 Krishnapatnam Railway Company Limited
 Karnataka Vijayanagar Steel Limited, NMDC Steel
 Madras Fertilizers
 Mahanagar Gas
 Millennium Telecom Ltd.
 Metal & Steel Factory
 Meja Urja Nigam Private Limited (MUNPL)
 National Capital Region Transport Corporation
 National Dairy Development Board
 National Highways and Infrastructure Development Corporation Limited
 National Highways Logistics Management Company
 National Projects Construction Corporation Ltd (NPCC)
 National Payments Corporation of India (NPCI)
 National Land Monetisation Corporation (NLMC)
 National Informatics Centre Services Inc. (NIC)
 National Industrial Corridor Development Corporation Limited
 Narmada Hydroelectric Development Corporation
 National High Power Test Laboratory(NHTPL)
 Neelachal Ispat Nigam Limited
 Orissa Drugs & Chemicals Ltd.(ODCL)
 Bharat Refractories Limited, Bokaro
 NewSpace India Limited
 NEPA Mills Ltd.
 NSEIT
 NSPCL (NTPC-SAIL Power Company Limited)
 Open Network for Digital Commerce
 IndiaFirst Life Insurance Company
 Infrastructure Development Finance Company (IDFC Limited)
 Industrial Finance Corporation of India Limited
 Indian Dairy Machinery Company Ltd. (IDMC)
 India Debt Resolution Company Limited (IDRCL)
 IHB Limited (a joint venture of IOCL, HPCL & BPCL)
 Indian Financial Technology and Allied Services
 Indian Highway Management Company Limited (IHMCL)
 Indian Vaccine Corporation Limited
 Indian Medicine Pharmaceutical Corporation Ltd.
 Indian Immunologicals Limited
 India Infrastructure Finance Company Limited (IIFCL)
 Indian Port Rail Corporation Limited
 India Ports Global Limited
 Indraprastha Gas Limited
 Indradhanush Gas Grid Limited (IGGL)
 Infrastructure Leasing & Financial Services
 India SME Asset Reconstruction Company Limited
 Indian Potash Limited
 Indian Strategic Petroleum Reserves Ltd
 Inland & Coastal Shipping Ltd.
 Inland Waterways Authority of India
 Instrumentation Limited
 Intelligent Communication Systems India Limited (ICSIL)
 Irrigation and Water Resources Finance Corporation Limited
 Petronet LNG
 Pipavav Railway Corporation Ltd. (PRCL)
 Power System Operation Corporation
 Prize Petroleum Company Limited
 Protean eGov Technologies Ltd. (Formerly NSDL e-Governance Infrastructure Limited)
 PTC India (formerly Power Trading Corporation India Limited)
 Punjab Logistics Infrastructure Limited
 Railway Energy Management Company Limited (REMCL)
 Rajasthan Drugs & Pharmaceuticals Limited(RDPL)
 Ramagundam Fertilizers and Chemicals Limited
 Ratnagiri Gas and Power
 Receivables Exchange of India Ltd (RXIL)
 Ropeways and Rapid Transport System Development Corporation
 Sagarmala Development Company
 SIDCUL CONCOR Infra Compny Limited
 Semiconductor Complex Limited
 Smith Stanisteet Pharmaceuticals Limited
 sethusamudram corporation limited
 Sponge Iron India Ltd (SIIL)
 STCI Finance Limited
 State Farms Corporation of India
 Tourism Finance Corporation Of India Ltd.
 Tusco Limited.
 Talcher Fertilizers Limited.
 Urban Mass Transit Company
 UTI Infrastructure Technology and Services Limited (UTIITSL)
 Triveni Structurals Limited
 Utkarsha Aluminium Dhatu Nigam Limited
 UV Asset Reconstruction Company Limited

List of Defense PSUs

 Armoured Vehicles Nigam Limited
 Advanced Weapons and Equipment India Limited 
 Gliders India Limited
 India Optel Limited 
 Munitions India Limited
 Troop Comforts Limited
 Yantra India Limited
 Indo-Russia Rifles (IRRPL)

List of CPSUs privatized

 Air India – sold to Tata Group in 2020
 Bharat Aluminium Company – sold to Vedanta Limited in 2000 but Aluminum plant closed in 2015 only power plant & land assets are working 
 CMC Limited – sold to Tata Consultancy Services in 2001, merged with TCS in 2016
 Lagan Engineering – in 2001
 Hindustan Zinc Limited – sold to Vedanta Limited in 2001
 HTL Limited, an optical fiber company - sold to HFCL in 2001
 Maruti Udyog Limited
 Modern Food Industries – sold to Hindustan Unilever in 2000
 Neelachal Ispat Nigam Limited - sold to Tata Steel Long Products in 2022
 Paradeep Phosphates Limited(PPL) - sold to Adventz Group in 2001
 Pawan Hans - sold to Star9 Mobility in 2022
 Videsh Sanchar Nigam Limited – sold to Tata Group in 2008
 Jessop & Company – sold to Ruia Group in 2003 but bankrupt in 2013 
 Indian Petrochemicals Corporation Limited – sold to Reliance Industries

List of Central PSUs (Financial Services)

Nationalised banks
Currently there are 12 Nationalised Banks in India (Government Shareholding power is denoted in %, as of 30 October 2022):

 State Bank of India (57.52%)
 Bank of Baroda (63.97%)
 Union Bank of India (83.49%)
 Punjab National Bank (73.15%)
 Canara Bank (62.93%)
 Punjab & Sind Bank (98.25%)
 Indian Bank (79.86%)
 Bank of Maharashtra (90.97%)
 Bank of India (81.41%)
 Central Bank of India (93.08%)
 Indian Overseas Bank (96.38%)
 UCO Bank (95.39%)

Regional rural banks
Currently there are 43 Regional Rural Banks in India, as of 1 April 2020:

Andhra Pradesh

Andhra Pragathi Grameena Bank
Andhra Pradesh Grameena Vikas Bank
Chaitanya Godavari Gramin Bank
Saptagiri Gramin Bank

Arunachal Pradesh	
Arunachal Pradesh Rural Bank

Assam
Assam Gramin Vikash Bank

Bihar
 Dakshin Bihar 
 Gramin Bank
Uttar Bihar Gramin Bank

Chhattisgarh
Chhattisgarh Rajya Gramin Bank

Gujarat
Baroda Gujarat Gramin Bank
Saurashtra Gramin Bank

Haryana
Sarva Haryana Gramin Bank

Himachal Pradesh
Himachal Pradesh Gramin Bank

Jammu and Kashmir
J&K Grameen Bank
Ellaquai Dehati Bank

Jharkhand
Jharkhand Rajya Gramin Bank

Karnataka
Karnataka Gramin Bank 
Karnataka Vikas Grameena Bank

Kerala
Kerala Gramin Bank

Madhya Pradesh
Madhyanchal Gramin Bank
Madhya Pradesh Gramin Bank

Maharashtra
Maharashtra Gramin Bank
Vidharbha Konkan Gramin Bank

Manipur
Manipur Rural Bank

Meghalaya
Meghalaya Rural Bank

Mizoram
Mizoram Rural Bank

Nagaland
Nagaland Rural Bank

Odisha	
Odisha Gramya Bank
Utkal Grameen Bank

Puducherry
Puduvai Bharathiar Grama Bank

Punjab	
Punjab Gramin Bank

Rajasthan	
Baroda Rajasthan Kshetriya Gramin Bank	
Rajasthan Marudhara Gramin Bank

Tamil Nadu
Tamil Nadu Grama Bank

Telangana
Telangana Grameena Bank

Tripura
Tripura Gramin Bank

Uttar Pradesh
Aryavart 
 Bank
Prathama UP 
 Gramin Bank
Baroda UP Bank
Uttarakhand
Uttarakhand Gramin Bank

West Bengal
Paschim Banga Gramin Bank	
Bangiya Gramin Vikash Bank
 Uttarbanga Kshetriya Gramin Bank

Nationalized insurance companies
Currently there are 7 Nationalized Insurance Companies (Government Shareholding power denoted in %, as of 1 April 2020):

Life Insurance Corporation of India(96.50%)
General Insurance Corporation of India (85.78%)
New India Assurance (85.44%)
National Insurance Company(100%)
The Oriental Insurance Company(100%)
United India Insurance Company(100%)
Agriculture Insurance Company of India(100%)

Nationalized Market exchanges
Currently there are 28 Nationalized Financial Market Exchanges in India:

National Stock Exchange of India
National Spot Exchange
Inter-connected Stock Exchange of India
Metropolitan Stock Exchange
Multi Commodity Exchange
National Commodity and Derivatives Exchange
Over the Counter Exchange of India
Bombay Stock Exchange 
Calcutta Stock Exchange 
Hyderabad Securities and Enterprise Limited 
Coimbatore Stock Exchange 
Saurashtra Kutch Stock Exchange
Mangalore Stock Exchange
Cochin Stock Exchange 
Bangalore Stock Exchange
Ludhiana Stock Exchange 
Gauhati Stock Exchange
Bhubaneswar Stock Exchange 
Jaipur Stock Exchange
Pune Stock Exchange
Madras Stock Exchange 
Uttar Pradesh Stock Exchange
Madhya Pradesh Stock Exchange 
Vadodara Stock Exchange
Delhi Stock Exchange 
Ahmedabad Stock Exchange

List of State PSUs

West Bengal State PSUs

See also
 Indian company law
 List of Public service commissions in India

References

 
Public sector in India
India government-related lists
India